Powell Lake Water Aerodrome  is located on Powell Lake, British Columbia, Canada.

Airlines and destinations

References

Seaplane bases in British Columbia
Powell River, British Columbia
Registered aerodromes in British Columbia